The International Day of Yoga has been celebrated across the world annually on June 21 since 2015, following its inception in the United Nations General Assembly in 2014.
Yoga is a physical, mental and spiritual practice which originated in ancient India. The Indian Prime Minister Narendra Modi, in his UN address in 2014, had suggested the date of June 21, as it is the longest day of the year in the Northern Hemisphere and shares a special significance in many parts of the world.

Origin

The Indian Prime Minister Narendra Modi, in his UN address in 2014, suggested an annual Day of Yoga on June 21, as it is the longest day of the year in the Northern Hemisphere and shares a special significance in many parts of the world. Following the initial proposal, the UN adopted the draft resolution, entitled "Day of Yoga", in 2014. The consultations were convened by the delegation of India.
In 2015 Reserve Bank of India issued a 10 rupees commemorative coin to mark the International Day of Yoga.
In April 2017, UN Postal Administration (UNPA) issued 10 stamps on Asanas on a single sheet to mark International Day of Yoga.

UN Declaration 
On 11 December 2014, India's Permanent Representative Asoke Mukherji introduced the draft resolution in the United Nations General Assembly. The draft text received broad support from 177 Member States who sponsored the text, which was adopted without a vote. This initiative found support from many global leaders. A total of 177 nations co-sponsored the resolution, which is the highest number of co-sponsors ever for any UNGA resolution of such nature.

When proposing 21 June as the date, Modi said that the date was the longest day of the year in the northern hemisphere (shortest in the southern hemisphere), having special significance in many parts of the world. In Indian calendars, the summer solstice marks the transition to Dakshinayana. The second full moon after summer solstice is known as Guru Poornima. In Hindu mythology, Shiva, the first yogi (Adi Yogi), is said to have begun imparting the knowledge of yoga to the rest of mankind on this day, and became the first guru (Adi Guru).

Following the adoption of the UN resolution, several leaders of the spiritual movement in India voiced their support for the initiative. The founder of Isha Foundation, Sadhguru, stated, "this could be a kind of a foundation stone to make scientific approach to the inner well-being of the human being, a worldwide thing... It's a tremendous step for the world." The founder of Art of Living, Ravi Shankar, lauded the efforts of Modi, saying, "It is very difficult for any philosophy, religion or culture to survive without state patronage. Yoga has existed so far almost like an orphan. Now, official recognition by the UN would further spread the benefit of yoga to the entire world."

In practice 

The first International Day of Yoga was observed around the world on 21 June 2015. The Ministry of AYUSH made the necessary arrangements in India. 35,985 people, including PM Modi and dignitaries from 84 nations, performed 21 asanas (yoga postures) for 35 minutes at Rajpath in New Delhi, becoming the largest yoga class ever held, and with the largest number—84—of participating nations. Similar days have been held in cities in India and around the world each year since then.

In 2020, Bulgarian prime minister Boyko Borissov recorded a video message to Indian prime minister Narendra Modi on the occasion of International Yoga Day.

Reception

An Associated Press report in 2015 noted that the first "International Yoga Day" involved "millions of yoga enthusiasts" who "stretched and twisted", as well as Modi and members of his cabinet. It stated that the main road in Delhi had become an exercise area for the occasion, and reported that while Modi was speaking of "peace and harmony", some people in India thought the promotion of yoga was a partisan Hindu operation. It reported that a sequence of Surya Namaskar (sun salutations) was dropped because Muslims objected to the implication that the sun was the Hindu god of the sun, Surya; the chanting of the Hindu sacred syllable "Om" was also dropped. Others considered that the money spent on the event might have been better spent on cleaning Delhi's streets.

The Christian Science Monitor wrote in 2016 that the 2014 United Nations resolution had been "wildly popular" but noted that yoga had a "meditative component" and had become known as not only a form of physical exercise but also a mental and spiritual practice. It gave as evidence the 2015 sermon by Pope Francis cautioning Roman Catholics about the idea that yoga could be a path to God; it noted, too, that Modi had replied to the charge that the Day was intended to promote Hinduism with the words "Yoga is not about the other life. Therefore, it is not a religious practice".

The Week stated in 2015 that the government of India's purpose in holding International Days of Yoga was to have yoga recognized around the world as "India's cultural property", citing India's minister of yoga, Shripad Yesso Naik as stating "We're trying to establish to the world that it's ours." The Week wrote that this was not likely to succeed, not least because many types of yoga were already being practised in the Western world. The article noted that Christian evangelicals agreed with the Indian government that yoga was "primarily a Hindu spiritual practice", but quoted the scholar of religion Ann Gleig as saying that most Western yoga was markedly changed by being in the West, and was devoid of religious content; the "ironically" agreeing views of strongly religious Hindus and Christians were "historically flawed".

See also 

 List of International Days of Yoga
 World Tai Chi and Qigong Day
 Yoga and cultural appropriation

References

External links

 Ministry of Ayush – International Day of Yoga
 International Day of Yoga, on UN.org

United Nations days
Recurring events established in 2014
June observances
Health awareness days
Yoga events
Articles containing video clips